Chondrosteidae  is a family of extinct marine actinopterygian fishes in the order Acipenseriformes. Three genera are known from the Early Jurassic of Europe, Chondrosteus, Gyrosteus, and Strongylosteus. Their skeleton was largely made up of bones (unlike living chondrosteans), but ossification was reduced compared to other ray-fins.

Evolutionary relationships
Chondrosteidae are related with the Late Jurassic to Early Cretaceous Asian family Peipiaosteidae, and with living sturgeon and paddlefish (Acipenseroidei). The Early Triassic Eochondrosteus from China is more basal than all other aforementioned acipenseriforms.

See also
 Prehistoric fish
 List of prehistoric bony fish

References

External links

Acipenseriformes
Fossils of Great Britain
Jurassic fish of Europe
Jurassic bony fish

Prehistoric ray-finned fish families